is a retired Japanese judoka.

Shimode is from Uchinada, Ishikawa and began judo at the age of 1st grader.

He began working for the Asahi Kasei after graduation from Tokai University in 1992.

Shimode participated All-Japan Championships 10 times and won a bronze medal in 2000.
In 2001, When he was at the age of 31, was chosen to represent Japan in the Jigoro Kano Cup and got a gold medal.

He retired in 2003.

Achievements
1987 - All-Japan Junior Championships (Heavyweight) 2nd
 - Inter-HighSchool Championships (Heavyweight) 1st
1989 - All-Japan University Championships (Heavyweight) 1st
1990 - Kodokan Cup (Heavyweight) 1st
 - All-Japan University Championships (Heavyweight) 1st
1991 - Pacific Rim Championships (Heavyweight) 1st
 - All-Japan University Championships (Heavyweight) 1st
1992 - Kodokan Cup (Heavyweight) 1st
2000 - All-Japan Championships (Openweight only) 3rd
 - Kodokan Cup (Heavyweight) 3rd
2001 - Jigoro Kano Cup (Heavyweight) 1st

References

Japanese male judoka
Tokai University alumni
Sportspeople from Ishikawa Prefecture
1969 births
Living people
20th-century Japanese people
21st-century Japanese people